Jesmond Delia (born 20 March 1967 in Malta) is a former professional footballer who last played for Maltese First Division side Pietà Hotspurs, where he played as a defender.

External links
 

1967 births
Living people
Maltese footballers
Malta international footballers
Floriana F.C. players
Hibernians F.C. players
Pietà Hotspurs F.C. players
Marsaxlokk F.C. players
Msida Saint-Joseph F.C. players
St. George's F.C. players
Mqabba F.C. players
Association football defenders